The 2014 Asian Boys' U18 Volleyball Championship was held in Colombo, Sri Lanka from 5 to 13 September 2014.

Pools composition
The teams are seeded based on their final ranking at the 2012 Asian Youth Boys Volleyball Championship.

* Withdrew

Venue
 Sugathadasa Indoor Stadium, Colombo, Sri Lanka

Preliminary round
All times are Sri Lanka Standard Time (UTC+05:30).

Pool A

|}

|}

Pool B

|}

|}

Pool C

|}

|}

Pool D

|}

|}

Classification round
All times are Sri Lanka Standard Time (UTC+05:30).
The results and the points of the matches between the same teams that were already played during the preliminary round shall be taken into account for the classification round.

Pool E

|}

|}

Pool F

|}

|}

Final round
All times are Sri Lanka Standard Time (UTC+05:30).

9th–15th places

9th–15th semifinals

|}

13th place match

|}

9th place matches

|}

Final eight

Quarterfinals

|}

5th–8th semifinals

|}

Semifinals

|}

7th place match

|}

5th place match

|}

3rd place match

|}

Final

|}

Final standing

Awards

Most Valuable Player
 Rasoul Aghchehli
Best Setter
 Javad Karimi
Best Outside Spikers
 Amirhossein Esfandiar
 Jan Min-han

Best Middle Blockers
 Ali Asghar Mojarrad
 Tao Zixuan
Best Opposite Spiker
 Rasoul Aghchehli
Best Libero
 Tomohiro Horie

References

External links
Official website
Squads

Asian Boys' U18 Volleyball Championship
Asian Cup
V
Asian Boys' U18 Volleyball Championship
Asian Boys' U18 Volleyball Championship